Istanbul Aydın University is a private university founded on May 18, 2007, in Istanbul, Turkey by extension of its predecessor, the  vocational college of Anadolu BIL that existed since September 26, 2003.

Current covered space of  will expand to  when the construction of  the technopark is completed.

Faculties
The university consists of ten faculties.
Faculty of Art and Sciences
Faculty of Communications
Faculty of Dentistry
Faculty of Economics and Administrative Sciences
Faculty of Education
Faculty of Engineering - Architecture
Faculty of Fine Arts
Faculty of Law
Faculty of Medicine

References

External links
Istanbul Aydın University official website

Educational institutions established in 2003
Private universities and colleges in Turkey
Istanbul Aydın University
2003 establishments in Turkey
Küçükçekmece